Gal Genish (born 16 December 1991) is an Israeli footballer.

Honours
Toto Cup (Leumit):
Runner-up (1): 2011

External links
 
 

1991 births
Living people
Israeli Jews
Israeli footballers
Maccabi Netanya F.C. players
Maccabi Ironi Bat Yam F.C. players
Maccabi Ironi Kfar Yona F.C. players
Hapoel Hadera F.C. players
Maccabi Ironi Kiryat Ata F.C. players
Beitar Nahariya F.C. players
Hapoel Ironi Baqa al-Gharbiyye F.C. players
Maccabi Daliyat al-Karmel F.C. players
Beitar Kfar Saba F.C. players
Hapoel Mahane Yehuda F.C. players
Hapoel Beit She'an F.C. players
Hapoel Bik'at HaYarden F.C. players
Hapoel Migdal HaEmek F.C. players
Israeli Premier League players
Liga Leumit players
Footballers from Netanya
Association football midfielders